The Battle of Imus, or the siege of Imus, was the first major battle of the Philippine revolution against the Spanish colonial government in the province of Cavite.  It was fought between September 1–3, 1896 at Imus, Cavite province in the Philippines, right after Bonifacio's ill-fated attack on the gunpowder magazine at the Battle of San Juan del Monte in Manila.

The resulting victory for the Filipino revolutionaries in Imus very much alarmed the Spanish government in the country. Following the conflict, they attempted to subdue the revolutionaries in Cavite province with the twin battles in Binakayan and Dalahican weeks after the battle in Imus.

Background 
The revolution began in Cavite province shortly after it joined the pro-independence Katipunan revolutionary movement under Andres Bonifacio. Emilio Aguinaldo began the revolution in the province by staging the Kawit Revolt on August 31, 1896.  He had gathered more men and armament for the imminent combat with the Spanish troops stationed in the province, and as time went on he and his men destroyed several Spanish units along the way, prompting the Spaniards to meet the revolutionaries in battle. The Spanish military commander in the province, Brigadier General Ernesto de Aguirre, felt confident that he could defeat the Caviteño fighters as his units are more properly armed and fed.

The town of Imus was the rebels' great strategic point. The town itself, situated in the center of a large well-watered plain, surrounded by agricultural land with a mere collection of wooded and bamboo dwellings. The distance from Manila, in straight line, would be about 14 miles, with good roads leading to the bay-shore towns. The people were very poor, being tenants or dependents of the friars, hence the only building of importance was the estate house of the Recollects (on what is now Cuartel or Camp Pantaleon Garcia). This estate house, situated in the middle of a compound surrounded by massive high walls, was a fortress through the eyes of the natives.

Prelude 
Emilio Aguinaldo in his memoirs, related that it was his cousin Baldomero Aguinaldo, President of the Magdalo Council, who led the first attack on Imus. As the head of the handful of men armed only with spears and bolos, Baldomero Aguinaldo rallied forth to Imus to test the reflexes of the Spanish defenders of the town. Emilio Aguinaldo and his men covered the rear in Binakayan against a possible attack coming from the marines stationed in Polverin in Kulaute. A contingent of civil guards on patrol, however, intercepted Baldomero Aguinaldo and his men before they could make their way into the town plaza. A running battle ensued and the rebels were forced to withdraw. The Spaniards suffered two casualties. The rebels however had to leave a wounded officer, Lt. Marcelino Cajulis, behind.

Battle

Opening phase 
On the morning of Tuesday, September 1, Jose Tagle, the Captain Municipal of Imus with a force of around 100 men, went to Kawit to seek the help of Aguinaldo. The Spaniards according to Tagle had entrenched themselves in the church, it would need all the forces the rebels could muster to dislodge them from their sanctuary. Emilio Aguinaldo hastily assembled a force of about six hundred men armed only with nine old rifles, three Remingtons taken from the civil guards, a gun used for shooting birds borrowed from the Municipal Captain of San Francisco de Malabon and an assortment of bolos and spears. Aguinaldo knew what he and his men were up against. He was apprehensive about how his men, totally inexperienced in soldiery but now transformed into a motley army, would react at the first sound of gunfire. Aguinaldo decided to play a deceptive psychological card. At the risk of advertising his attack, he invited a band to lead his column. As the column begun to march, the band burst into the march Battala de Jolo. Many could have doubted the wisdom of it all, its military sense. Aguinaldo knew what he was doing. His men were raw, and like him, a prey to fear that unusually stalks an army before an attack. Aguinaldo himself confessed to a fear, which he knew he and his men were grappling heroically to hide behind the veneer of courage.

The band as Aguinaldo gambled, played a pivotal role. It whipped martial enthusiasm among the men and dissipated whatever fears and misgivings had lurked in their hearts at the start of the march. The band also attracted other men to join the group. By the time the column had reached Imus, it had swelled to around two thousand men.

Initial attacks
The first to be attacked was the church and convent where Aguinaldo was told the friars and civil guards had barricaded themselves. Aguinaldo divided his men into three groups all to converge like massive fists upon the target. The first group under Baldomero Aguinaldo was to attack from the north; the second group under Tagle was to attack from the south, and the third group led by Aguinaldo himself, was to deliver the frontal blow.

Aguinaldo and Tagle at the head of their columns crawled toward their objective. When Aguinaldo had reached a house adjoining the church, he ordered his bugler to sound the advance and shouting "sisid!" (dive!), led his men to attack. The rebels broke down the huge door of the church and discovered to their disappointment that they had been cheated by their quarry. A retinue of civil guards and some seventeen friars were able to sneak out of the church to seek safety at the formidable estate house with its massive high walls. To face the rebels, they had left a lone Filipino priest – Fr. Pedro Buenaventura.

Failed Imus Estate House attack
Aguinaldo and his men braced themselves for the assault on the estate house with its fortification-like walls providing the friars and civil guards the protection against rebel attack. The Spaniards, led by Fray Eduarte were waiting for the rebel assault intending to wait out the reinforcements from Manila. Some rebels fired by their number, tried to rush the estate house. But an intense volley of gunfire sent them back crippled by a number of casualties. Aguinaldo saw the folly and futility of a direct attack. He decided on another tack. Accompanied by Guillermo Samoy, he crept towards the gate of the estate house intent on prying it open or breaking it down. The gate, however, was securely bolted from the inside that the efforts of two proved puny and worthless. Samoy died helping Aguinaldo make the break through.

Regrouping 
Aguinaldo regrouped his men and changed tactics. He would scour the walls of the estate house for weak points where he could bore a hole and breach it. He found the estates house's Achilles heel at the southeast corner where the walls were thinner and therefore more vulnerable. Aguinaldo and some of his men tore a hole through the thin walls, crept in and ran straight to the rice warehouses adjoining the estate house where the friars and the civil guards had taken sanctuary and poured petroleum on it. Rafael Sabater from Imus applied the torch. The unfortunate refugees were unable to stand the thick smoke and raging fire dashing out of the warehouse to captivity.

In the words of John Foreman,
"After a siege, which lasted long enough for General Blanco to have sent troops against them, the rebels captured Imus estate-house on September 1, and erected barricades there. Thirteen of the priests fell into their hands. They cut trenches and threw up earthworks in several of the main roads of the province, and strengthened their position at Novaleta.  Marauding parties were sent out everywhere to steal the crops and live-stock, which were conveyed in large quantities to Imus. Some of the captured priests were treated most barbarously. One was cut up piecemeal; another was saturated with petroleum and set on fire; and a third was bathed in oil and fried on a bamboo spit run through the length of his body.  There was a Requiem Mass for this event."

First Spanish relief attempt 
On 2 September, a Spanish relief column commanded by Brig. General Ernesto de Aguirre had been dispatched from Manila to aid the beleaguered defenders of Imus. Supported only by a hundred troops and by a cavalry, Aguirre gave the impression that he had been sent out to suppress a minor disturbance. Informed of this, Aguinaldo and five hundred of his men rushed to the Zapote Bridge to the north at the entrance to Cavite to attempt to stall the entry of Spanish reinforcements into the province. In a battle fought heroically on both sides near Zapote Bridge and the town of Bacoor, the revolutionaries, incapable of matching the superior firepower and discipline of the Spanish army, suffered severe losses and were forced to flee south towards Imus in disarray. It was this setback that spread the rumors that Aguinaldo was killed demoralizing the confidence of the rebels. However, Aguinaldo had managed to escape capture from General Aguirre by feigning death in the battlefield. Together with one of his men, Eugenio Orcullo, Aguinaldo broke through the Spanish cordon and limped back to Imus. His return later revived the flagging spirit of his men energizing their resolve to fight.

"General Aguirre could have ended the rebellion right then and there had he marched to Imus and taken the town," wrote historians Archutegi and Bernard. "But Aguirre felt the inadequacy of his troops and hastened back to Manila to get reinforcements. Then he marched southward towards Imus." Aguirre thus squandered a day that would prove enormously significant for Aguinaldo and to Imus. When General Aguirre returned with an additional five hundred to three thousand Spanish troops from Manila, the rebels in Imus were ready for him. This indicates that while the engagement at Zapote Bridge and Bacoor was a tactical disaster for the revolutionaries, it was a strategic gain for them since they forced the Spanish army to withdraw back to Manila, sacrificing a day to gather more men in what would prove to be a fortuitous event for them.

Revolutionaries prepare for a major Spanish counterattack 

Aguinaldo returned to Imus after the disaster in Zapote and Bacoor to the delight and joy of his men at seeing him alive. He brought the sobering news that the Spaniards had scored an important victory and would march to Imus to complete their rout of the rebels. He told them that probably Aguirre and his troops were regrouping in Bacoor for the final assault.

With frenzied zeal bordering nearly on desperation, Aguinaldo and his men prepared the defense of Imus. Aguinaldo knew that his badly undermanned army was no match against the adequately armed and heavily reinforced army of Aguirre. So he placed the fate of Imus – and thereby the revolution itself – on one element: surprise. They believe if they catch the Spaniards by surprise, they would win a decisive victory.

With additional arms captured from the town of Imus, the rebels touted the following weapons in their armory: 30 Remingtons, two rifles, a mounted cannon and thousands of rounds of ammunition. They were pitiful but Aguinaldo knew that they had the advantage; they commanded the terrain. They would dictate the tempo of the fight.

Aguinaldo instructed Jose Tagle and his men to build trenches along Imus River where the enemies were expected to pass and one span of the Bridge of Isabel II next to the hacienda was blown up.  Pillboxes were built at hidden strategic places on the other side of the bank opposite the road expected to be taken by the enemy. With all his men armed with guns and bolos hiding, they were instructed not to fire any shot, even if the enemy is already in sight. No firing until the cannon from Aguinaldo at the foot of the broken bridge is fired, signaling the vanguard of the enemy has reached the bridge.

Turn of the tide 

On September 3, the Spanish column advanced upon Imus under cover of heavy artillery gunfire. If there were remnants of rebel forces hiding in the town the carpet of artillery fire would smoke them out of their hiding places and force them to flee. Meanwhile, the rebels held their breath and their fire. Their lives – and the life of their town – hung upon outsmarting their foes and deceiving them to walk into their trap.

The Spaniards, filled with confidence borne of their victory at Bacoor and Zapote, marched on to the staccato burst of cannon fire and shouts of "Viva Espana!" (Long live Spain!).  It was this confidence that dulled the military sense that completely disarmed the Spaniards. The approach to the hacienda bridge was unguarded, the bridge itself was a solitary span with no soul guarding it and there were no answering fires from the rebels. The rebels might have managed to regroup but their morale is questionable concerning whether it could withstand the shock of the approaching Spanish army more powerful than the force that had inflicted their defeat in Bacoor and Zapote announcing its relentless advance through the angry barks of cannon fire.

When the Spanish army had reached the blasted end of the estate house bridge, the mountain cannon was fired signaling the battle was on. A cacophony of fire burst from the bushes, catching the Spaniards by surprise. Pandemonium broke loose, panic gripped their ranks, and Spanish soldiers fired back wildly against their unseen foes.

Final and decisive blow 

During the burning of the bushes surrounding the riverbanks, Aguinaldo realized his mistake. He did not provide for his men to close down the rear of the bridge to seal the only escape route the Spaniards could take to save themselves. To mitigate this mistake, and therefore to effect the destruction of the Spanish reinforcement column, Aguinaldo took some of his men to Presa Talon where the current was very strong, for him and his men to ford the river and head towards the other side of the bridge to cut off the only Spanish escape route. The first attempt at crossing the river failed because some men were swept by the strong current. However, a second crossing attempt was made, with the rebels closely holding arms together to counter the river's current. They have successfully completed the crossing, having reached that part of the river where the bamboo clumps were thick and the foliage provided protection. As soon as this was done, Aguinaldo and his men headed towards the other bridgehead at the Spanish rear, thus closing the trap. When rebel firing started at the rear, the Spaniards knew that they were caught in a bind. They fought desperately to break out and fled confused in haste back to Bacoor, but most were killed, wounded and missing with a few men captured. General Aguirre fell from his horse and in his hurry to escape, left behind his "Sable de Mando" (command sabre) crafted in Toledo in 1869, which Aguinaldo managed to retrieve; the former was later killed by the pursuing Caviteño rebels. Because the year the said sabre was created was also his birth year, he used the sword during his engagements for the duration of the revolution.

According to Aguinaldo, his men gathered two cartloads of mutilated dead Spaniards, but was silent about rebel casualties. The Magdalo picked up 30 Remingtons plus ammunition. Shortly thereafter, with no hope of further relief after the destruction of the relief army at the Bridge of Isabel II, the remaining Spaniards still holed up in the estate house within the town of Imus surrendered to the rebels.

Aftermath 
After the battle of Imus, and because Kawit was under bombardment from Cavite port and the Spanish gunboats at Manila, Aguinaldo transferred his seat of government to Imus. The first revolutionary government then had Baldomero Aguinaldo as president and Candido Tria Tirona as War Secretary and portfolios for finance, natural resources, agriculture and justice. Aguinaldo had upped his title to Jefe de Abanderado (Flag Lt. General). An armament factory, the Imus arsenal, was also set up in the town.

The Spaniards became more cautious on the ongoing revolution in the province. Emilio Aguinaldo together with other Katipunero leaders from other factions scored even more victories within his native Cavite province with their provincial revolutionary militia army exponentially growing by the news of every rebel victory, overrunning most Spanish garrisons in the province. By the end of October 1896 nearly all of the province, save for the towns of San Roque, Caridad, Carmona and Bacoor, the Spanish naval garrison in Kawit, and the provincial capital city of Cavite el Viejo belonged to the Filipino rebels.

Prior to the rebel victory at Imus, the mood of the locals situated in the Tagalog-speaking provinces of central Luzon concerning in favor of the revolution have been in serious question, mostly due to the fiascoes of supreme leader of the Katipuan revolutionary movement, Andres Bonifacio, during the initial battles of the revolution. No further effort to support the revolution has been made in the provinces after those. However, as news of the victory at Imus spread throughout, the revolutionary mood in all of the said provinces finally gained traction. As a result, several militia armies were raised once again all throughout Central Luzon, in the hopes of repeating the rebel success at Imus in their home provinces and thus gain independence from Spain.

Emilio Aguinaldo became even more spectacular at the twin battles at Noveleta and Kawit towns more than two months later, where the revolutionaries won their first major decisive victory against the Spaniards.

Legacy 

The perceptive student of history cannot fail to reach the following conclusions resulting from the battle of Imus on September 3, 1896.

Nick Joaquin, a noted Filipino historian, spoke of Aguinaldo's victory in Imus as the "spark which started the revolt in Bulacan." According to him 300 Bulakan Katipuneros gathered to attack the Spanish garrison at the barrio of San Nicolas . After Bonifacio's defeat at San Juan Del Monte, Bulakan made no further effort to rise in arms until they heard the news of Aguinaldo in Cavite. Aguinaldo's victory in the second battle of Imus saved the revolution from collapse.  The fiasco of Andres Bonifacio at San Juan Del Monte threw a pall gloom in the revolution. The rebel victory at the second battle of Imus rekindled the fluttering spark of resistance. It energized the rebels into greater resolve.

Third, it made Aguinaldo the undisputed leader of the revolution. By his own admission, he entered the town a flag lieutenant. He left the town as a General, to be recognized by his fellow Caviteños as General Miong, the hero of the revolution in the province.

See also 
Battle of Binakayan and Dalahican
Philippine Revolution

References

External links 

 116th 'Battle of Imus' rites
 First Shots of the Philippine Revolution

Battles of the Philippine Revolution
History of Cavite
Imus